Haliotis cyclobates, common name the whirling abalone or the circular ear shell, is a species of sea snail, a marine gastropod mollusk in the family Haliotidae, the abalones.

Description
The size of the shell attains 60 mm. "The elevated shell is nearly circular in outline and somewhat turbinate. The distance of the apex from the margin is between one-third and one-fourth the greater than the diameter of the shell. The body whorl is rounded and convex above. The surface is covered with spiral cords and threads, and has numerous folds radiating from the suture. The five perforations are oval, not raised. The shell is nearly circular and very convex. The spire is decidedly elevated and is formed of about three rounded whorls. The last whorl has a blunt keel at the row of holes, and a narrower, more acute carina at a short distance below it. The space between both is a little concave. The entire surface has close spiral cords and threads which are sometimes somewhat granose. There are numerous folds radiating from the suture, but not long enough to reach the periphery. The coloration consists of broad radiating patches or oblique stripes of chestnut-brown, green and flesh-color or whitish. The inner surface is silvery with red and green reflections. The muscle impression is not distinct. The columellar plate is flat, not truncate below, strongly sloping inward. The generally five perforations are oval, their edges only a trifle raised."

Distribution
This marine species is endemic to Australia and occurs off South Australia, Victoria and Western Australia.

References

 Péron, F. 1816. Voyage de découvertes aux Terres Australes [Historique]: exécuté par ordre de Sa Majesté l'empereur et roi, sur les corvettes le Geographe, le Naturaliste, et la goelette le Casuarina, pendant les années 1800, 1801, 1802, 1803 et 1804. Paris : Imprimerie imperiale.
 Lamarck, J.B.P.A. de M. 1822. Histoire Naturelle des Animaux sans Vertèbres. Suite des Gastéropodes. Paris : J.B. Lamarck Vol. 6(2) 232 pp.
 Wilson, B. 1993. Australian Marine Shells. Prosobranch Gastropods. Kallaroo, Western Australia : Odyssey Publishing Vol. 1 408 pp.
 Geiger, D.L. & Poppe, G.T. 2000. A Conchological Iconography. The family Haliotidae. Germany : ConchBooks 135 pp.
 Geiger, D.L. 2000 [1999]. Distribution and biogeography of the recent Haliotidae (Gastropoda: Vetigastropoda) world-wide. Bollettino Malacologico 35(5–12): 57-120
 Degnan, S.D., Imron, Geiger, D.L. & Degnan, B.M. 2006. Evolution in temperate and tropical seas: disparate patterns in southern hemisphere abalone (Mollusca: Vetigastropoda: Haliotidae). Molecular Phylogenetics and Evolution 41: 249–256
 Geiger D.L. & Owen B. (2012) Abalone: Worldwide Haliotidae. Hackenheim: Conchbooks. viii + 361 pp.

External links
 

cyclobates
Gastropods of Australia
Gastropods described in 1816